Paul M. Dabbar (born July 8, 1967) is an American investment banker and government official who served as Under Secretary of Energy for Science. Prior to assuming his current role, he was the managing director for mergers & acquisitions at J.P. Morgan & Co. He also served on the United States Department of Energy's Environmental Management Advisory Board.

Dabbar is a graduate of the United States Naval Academy and Columbia Business School. He served as a nuclear submarine officer aboard the  out of Mare Island, California, and Pearl Harbor, Hawaii, including deployment to the North Pole, where he conducted environmental research. He has been a lecturer at the U.S. Naval Academy and has conducted research at the Johns Hopkins Applied Physics Laboratory.

References

Living people
1967 births
United States Naval Academy alumni
Columbia Business School alumni
United States Department of Energy officials
Trump administration personnel
American investment bankers
People from Bartlesville, Oklahoma